Rebii Erkal (10 February 1911 – 25 November 1985) was a Turkish footballer and manager. He was born in Istanbul.

Erkal played for Galatasaray SK his whole career, making him memorable for many Gala supporters. He was also part of Turkey's squad at the 1936 Summer Olympics. In 1951, after his active playing career ended, he became the manager of the Turkey national football team. Under Erkal's charge, the national squad managed to defeat the Germany national football team 2-1 in Berlin.

Career statistics

International goals

References

External links
FIFA.com
Rebii Erkal's profile at Sports Reference.com

1911 births
1984 deaths
Footballers from Istanbul
Turkish football managers
Turkish footballers
Galatasaray S.K. footballers
Olympic footballers of Turkey
Footballers at the 1936 Summer Olympics
Turkey national football team managers
Turkey international footballers
Beyoğlu SK managers
Association football forwards